The Giblin family of Tasmania was an influential family in the early days of the colony of Tasmania, or Van Diemen's Land as it was earlier named. The list below is not exhaustive, but should help in establishing relationships between family members encountered in histories and elsewhere in Wikipedia.

Origin
Robert Wilkins Giblin (17 May 1780 – 1 September 1845) was an English emigrant who arrived in Hobart Town, Van Diemen's Land aboard the Sir Charles Forbes in 1827 with his wife and eight children. He had run a school in England which failed in the financial crash of a few years before, and would run a school near Hobart in the 1830s and early 1840s before being declared insolvent. Many of his descendants and their marriage partners occupied influential positions in the young colony.

The family
Robert Wilkins Giblin (17 May 1780 – 1 September 1845)  married Jessy Elizabeth Dobby (25 June 1780 – 31 May 1852) lived Brisbane Street

Sarah Wilkins Giblin (1804–1855)

Thomas Giblin (19 February 1808 – 21 August 1880) married Caroline Maria Dawes ( –1840) on 27 June 1833; he married again, to Mary Ann Worthy (28 October 1827 – 25 August 1912) on 31 October 1846. He was  manager of Bank of Van Diemen's Land.

Sarah Eliza Giblin (1 April 1834 – 17 July 1929) married William Crosby ( – ) on 14 February 1857

Maria Lord Giblin (1836 – ) married Alexander Barrie Armour on 23 January 1856
Robert William Giblin (25 November 1839 – 6 August 1877) married Emily Creed (26 March 1844 – 10 August 1928). He was an accountant, broke his neck falling down stairs.
Florence Emily Giblin (1871 – 25 August 1897)
Ernest Robert William Giblin (1877 – ) married Lucy Ashton Henry
(Caroline) Emily Giblin (1 January 1848 – 28 January 1940) married Crawford John Maxwell on 9 December 1880
Dr. Edward Owen Giblin (23 November 1849 – 27 December 1895) married Edith Harriett Westbrook on 6 August 1879
Gwenilian Giblin (21 November 1880 – 16 January 1943) married James McKenzie
Edward Trevor Giblin (16 February 1882 – 30 December 1946) married Marjorie Nott (22 December 1891 – 24 July 1956) in June 1913
Gladys Giblin (12 June 1883 – 14 April 1928) married James Crombie
Leonard Giblin (22 November 1886 – 31 December 1916) killed in France during WWI.
Mary Ann Giblin (3 August 1852 – 17 June 1934)
Herbert James Giblin (30 July 1854 – ) married Amy Mitchell on 15 March 1880. She was a daughter of John Mitchell MHA
Catherine Augusta Giblin (29 April 1882 – 19 February 1961)
Mary Giblin (1886 – 1983) married painter Lucien Dechaineux (15 July 1869 – 4 April 1957) on 21 December 1909. This was his second marriage; first marriage was to Isabella Jane "Ella" Briant (1863 – 5 May 1908).
Emile Dechaineux (3 October 1902 – 1944) killed in WWII in command of HMAS Australia. He was Lucien's son by the earlier marriage
Bertrand L. Dechaineux ( – ) married Leslie Vincent on 9 September 1939. He was Hobart City Council's architect and surveyor.
Yvonne Dechaineux ( – ) married Thomas Stone on 3 February 1947
Norris Giblin (22 December 1889 – ) married Mary Robertson Gordon of Winnipeg on 24 December 1923
Arthur Leslie Giblin (8 December 1856 – 31 March 1887) married Helen Aurora Ralfe ( – 22 July 1944) on 17 January 1883. He was a solicitor
Marjorie Mary Giblin (17 December 1883 – )
Winifred Helen "Winnie" Giblin (12 March 1885 – ) married Sydney Mack
Arthur Leslie Giblin (13 May 1887 – ) married Margaret Norah Flanagan in Cairo on 2 June 1919. He was a medical doctor.

Lewis Vincent Giblin (27 January 1859 – 21 December 1880) married Elizabeth Eleanor Sharp(e?) and accidentally drowned. She married again, to Walter F. Pretyman on 23 November 1892
Eric Louis Giblin (30 April 1880 – 28 September 1915) missionary in Papua then with (British) RAMC killed in Loos, France during WWI

Ronald Worthy Giblin (3 January 1863 – 13 March 1936)  married Elizabeth "Bessie" Lloyd (8 June 1868 – 24 January 1960) on 18 February 1896
Ronald Graham LLloyd Giblin (20 November 1897 – ) married Sibyl Marie Macleod (26 December 1897 – ) at Cairo on 14 March 1931. He was Captain of Signaller Corps.
Harold Wanostrocht Giblin (24 November 1899 – )
Florence Mabel Giblin (3 July 1864 – 24 December 1931) married Mark S. Mitchell on 28 May 1885
Dr. Wilfrid Wanostrocht Giblin MRCS LRCP (12 May 1872 – 10 October 1951) married Muriel Gertrude Maxwell (24 February 1872 – 12 May 1950) on 6 September 1899. Served as (medical corps) Lieut-Col. during WWI
Dr. Thomas Giblin FRCS, FRACS (17 June 1903 – 18 March 1979) married Nancy Rymill ( – ) on 19 December 1928. Nancy was daughter of Arthur G. Rymill. He served as Lieutenant-Colonel, Australian Army Medical Corps, at El Alamein in WWII, after which he married again, to Anne Hamilton Ayliffe and had three children: Thomas (1946), Joanna Maxwell (1950), Anne Veronica Maxwell (1951).
Nancy Muriel Giblin (21 April 1905 – ) married Lt. Cdr. Roy Lethbridge ( – ) of HMAS Australia on 5 May 1931. They had two daughters: Elizabeth Ann and Jennifer, settled in England after WWII.
Elizabeth "Betty" Giblin (6 December 1909 – ) married Eng. Cdr. William "Bill" Armitage ( – ) on 6 March 1943
Edward Maxwell Giblin (5 March 1913 – 2 December 2011) married Nyra Ross Black (1923 – 16 March 1983) c. 1947. They had a son Robert and Daughter Barbara
William Giblin (2 January 1810 – 8 April 1884) married Marian  Falkiner (1815 – 14 November 1840) on 23 January 1836. He married again, to Elizabeth ?? (c. 1813 – February 1890) sometime around 1845, lived at "Lenaker", Sandy Bay.

Marian Falkiner Giblin (26 November 1836 – 21 November 1891)
Henrietta Selina Giblin (23 April 1839 – 29 December 1906)  married (Adolarius Humphrey) A. H. Boyd SM. (1827 – 23 November 1891) on 18 May 1871. Boyd was for some time Governor of Port Arthur prison.
William Robert Giblin (4 November 1840 – 17 January 1887) married  Emmely  Jean Perkins (c. 1841 – 2 January 1926) on 5 January 1865. She was eldest daughter of John Perkins, M.H.A.; he was Premier of Tasmania in 1878, puisne judge of the Supreme Court of Tasmania. Lived at Ivy Lodge.

William Leslie Giblin (28 February 1867 – 20 July 1901) He served with US Army Medical Corps.
Edith Mary Giblin (1868 – ) married Robert Hall on 17 September 1908. She wrote (unpublished) children's story The Young Explorer.

Lyndhurst Falkiner Giblin DSO, MC (29 November 1872 – 1 March 1951) noted political economist
Alan Vincent Giblin (13 February  1877 – )

Howard Norman Giblin (29 December 1878 – 1 September 1944)
Muriel Kathleen Giblin (28 December 1882 – 30 May 1950) married Rev. Ashley Howard Teece (24 July 1879 – 26 August 1943) on 21 October 1907
Hannah Elizabeth Giblin (16 August 1846 – 16 November 1925)

Adah Caroline Giblin (26 February 1848 – 18 November 1937) married John Ridley Walker on 8 August 1882
Norman Frederick Giblin (1 September 1849 – 23 August 1902) married Kate Gatenby on 14 January 1879. He was manager of the Bank of New Zealand.
Elizabeth Mary Giblin (12 June 1851 – ) married Herbert Gatenby on 30 December 1875
Sarah Roberta Giblin (27 July 1853 – 5 May 1925) married William Reid Bell on 21 June 1888
Constance Charlotte Giblin (22 June 1854 – 2 December 1929) married Sir George Davies KCMG on 19 November 1891
Robert Giblin (13 January 1812 – 18/19? January 1889) married Elizabeth Jane (Jessie Elizabeth?) Sutherland (1828 – 3 October 1861) on 7 July 1853. He married again, to Sophia R. Lovell (c. 1826 – September 1895) on 29 January 1870. He was a schoolmaster. She was widow of Esh Lovell (died 16 May 1865).

Charlotte Giblin (1813 – 3 January 1879) married Ebenezer Shoobridge (1820–1901)
William Ebenezer Shoobridge  (1846–1940)
Robert Wilkins Giblin Shoobridge (1847–1936)
Louis Manton Shoobridge (1851–1939)
Vincent Wanostrocht Giblin (13 November 1817 – 15 May 1884) married Jane Isabel Evans (c. 1819 – 29 May 1905) on 13 January 1841. Cricketer and manager, bank of Victoria, then Australian Joint Stock Bank, Sydney. She was daughter of G. W. Evans, Deputy Surveyor-General of Van Diemen's Land.
Vincent Evans Giblin (c. 1841 – 1 January 1862)
Jessie Isabel Giblin (1843 – 1915) married Charles Alfred Robey, son of Ralph Meyer Robey.
Jessy Elizabeth Giblin (10 July 1821 – 19 December 1904) married Francis Conder "Frank" Tribe (1820 – 24 July 1910) on 17 November 1849. He was in 1866 tried for embezzlement and in 1867 for false pretences but both times acquitted. They moved to Victoria.
Mary Wanostrocht Giblin (1824 – ) married John Alfred Huxtable ( – ) on 22 November 1848

Bibliography
William Coleman, Selwyn Cornish, Alf Hagger  Giblin's Platoon: The Trials and Triumph of the Economist in Australian Public Life ANU Press. . This book includes many references to L. F. Giblin's family and antecedents.
Wilfrid W. Giblin Kith and kin : some notes on our branch of the family privately pub. Hobart 1945
Lloyd Ashton Giblin Tracing my Giblin ancestors pub. Lagpress, Sandy Bay (Tas.) c. 1982

References 

Australian families